Promontorium Fresnel (Latin for "Cape Fresnel") is a headland on the near side of the Moon. It is located at the northern end of the Montes Apenninus and separates the lunar mares of Mare Serenitatis and Mare Imbrium. Just west of the mountainous cape is Rimae Fresnel. Both features were named after the French physicist Augustin-Jean Fresnel.

References

External links

Promontorium Fresnel at the Moon Wiki
Lunar Orbiter images of Promontorium Fresnel
 

Mountains on the Moon